Jessica Allan (born 26 May 1999) is an Australian rules footballer playing for Adelaide in the AFL Women's (AFLW). She is the sister of Adelaide player, Sarah Allan.

Early life and career
Allan grew up in Beachport, South Australia, the daughter of former Central District Football Club player Keith Allan. She began playing football when she was five years old and before her AFLW career played for Salisbury in the South Australian Women's Football League.

Allan captained the Allies (a representative team consisting of players from South Australia, the Northern Territory and Tasmania) in the 2017 Under-18 National Championships and was named vice-captain of the All-Australian team from the tournament. She also played for Glenelg in the inaugural SANFL Women's League. In the 2017 AFLW Draft Combine she won the vertical running jump test and came sixth in the 20-metre sprint.

AFLW career
Allan was drafted by Adelaide with their first selection and eighth overall in the 2017 AFL Women's draft.

After spending the 2019 season on the inactive list due to intensive training for the Australian Army, Allan was required to move to Canberra for her army career and was traded to Greater Western Sydney.

Allan played for Greater Western Sydney for two seasons and then spent two seasons on the inactive list during 2022 due to her army training. She was then required by the army to move back to Adelaide and was traded back to Adelaide.

Player profile
Allan is a ruck with strong contested marking skills and vertical jump.

References

External links 

1999 births
Living people
Adelaide Football Club (AFLW) players
Australian rules footballers from South Australia
Greater Western Sydney Giants (AFLW) players